Puzzletown is an unincorporated community and census-designated place (CDP) in Blair County, Pennsylvania, United States.

Geography
Puzzletown is found at the bottom of a valley which leads up to Blue Knob, the second-highest mountain in the state and part of the Allegheny Front, the eastern edge of the Appalachian Plateau. It is a rural area with a population of three to five hundred at its most liberal definition and less than one hundred at its most restrictive.

Puzzletown is considered by most to be the Puzzletown Road, a road leading to the southwest from Newry, and all of the short side streets and housing developments on it; others extend this for several miles after the road's name becomes Knob Run Road and others limit it to only the intersection of Puzzletown Road and Poplar Run Road and the few nearby side streets.

History
Formerly called Poplar Run, Puzzletown was founded in about 1840.

References

Unincorporated communities in Blair County, Pennsylvania
Unincorporated communities in Pennsylvania
Census-designated places in Blair County, Pennsylvania
Census-designated places in Pennsylvania